Rkatsiteli (Georgian რქაწითელი rkats’iteli; literally "red stem" or "red horned") is a kind of grape used to produce white wine.

History
This ancient vinifera originates in Georgia and is supposed to be one of the oldest grape varieties.  

Rkatsiteli was the most widely planted grape variety in the Soviet Union and, by 1978, was responsible for 18% of all Soviet wine production. There it was used to make everything from table wine to liqueurs to Sherry-like fortified wine. Prior to President Gorbachev's vine pull scheme, it was possibly the world's most widely planted white wine grape.

In Kakheti it was particularly known for its sweet dessert wines fashioned in the same manner as port wine. There were many attempts to create a sparkling wine from the grape but its naturally high alcohol levels prevented it from being much of a success.

Wine regions
The grape is mostly planted in its ancestral home of Georgia though there are still sizable plantings in other Eastern European countries like Russia, Armenia, Bulgaria, Moldova, Romania, North Macedonia, Azerbaijan and Ukraine.

Other regions
It is also planted, in small amounts, in Australia and the eastern United States, mainly in the Finger Lakes region of New York state, Massachusetts, New Jersey and in Virginia and North Carolina . There have also been some experimental plantings in California, the Grand Valley AVA and West Elks AVA of Colorado and China (where the grape is known as Baiyu).

Viticulture
The high acidity of the grape is prone to make the wines excessively tart so winemakers try to pick the grapes as late as possible in order to maximize the sugar balance to offset the acidity. In most regions of Eastern Europe harvest is typically in mid October.

Wine style
Rkatsiteli makes noticeably acidic, balanced white wine with spicy and floral notes in the aroma.

References

Georgian words and phrases
White wine grape varieties
Georgian wine
Georgian products with protected designation of origin
Grape varieties of Georgia